Pattaya Thai-Tech Futsal Club (Thai สโมสรฟุตซอลพัทยา ไทย-เทค) is a Thai Futsal club based in Pattaya, Chonburi Province. The club plays in the Futsal Thai League.

External links 
 Pattaya Thai-Tech Futsal Club
 "เปิดตัวสิงห์โต๊ะเล็ก “พัทยา ไทย-เทค” ลุยโม่แข้งฟุตซอลไทยลีก "

Futsal clubs in Thailand
Chonburi province